Light House Hill is situated in Hampankatta, the heart of Mangalore City in the southern India. It was built by Hyder Ali and was used as watch tower for Sultanate of Mysore Navy.

Educational institutions
Light House Hill is the location of two famous educational institutions in Mangalore, namely St. Aloysius College and Kasturba Medical College.

Religious places
The famous religious places here are the St. Aloysius Chapel and the Idgah Mosque.

Public utilities
The City Central Library is located close to St Aloysius college. This library is run by the Mangalore City Corporation. There are several branches for city central library within Mangalore.

The lighthouse
The first lighthouse of Mangalore is located in the heart of the Mangalore city. This "Light House" was built by Hyder Ali, the de facto ruler of Mysore and stood as the watch tower of Sultanate of Mysore Navy under him and great his great son Tipu Sultan. The huge watchtower in the hill served as a base for the British,  from where many resident commanders of the British Navy would monitor the movement of travelling ships. The base of the light house has a library, with a reading room named after Karnad Sadashiv Rao, a renowned freedom fighter.

References

Lighthouses in India
Buildings and structures in Mangalore
Geography of Mangalore